Alberth Villalobos (born 25 January 1995) is a Costa Rican footballer who plays as a midfielder for  Deportivo Mixco.

Villalobos made his debut for the senior Costa Rica national team at the Avaya Stadium on 2 February 2019 against the  United States.

References

1995 births
Living people
Costa Rican footballers
Association football midfielders
Costa Rica international footballers
A.D. San Carlos footballers